Evening Rain (Chinese: 巴山夜雨) is a 1981 Chinese drama film which reflects the fight between Chinese people and the Gang of Four during the ten years of turmoil in China. It was directed by Wu Yonggang and Wu Yigong with Li Zhiyu, Zhang Yu, Lin Bin playing the leading roles. This movie won the first Golden Rooster Awards for Best Picture in 1981, a prize it shared with Xie Jin's Legend of Tianyun Mountain.

Plot
During the time the "Gang of Four” is on the rampage in China, a poet named Qiu Shi who has been in prison for 6 years is secretly transferred from Sichuan to Wuhan by boat under the guard of Li Yan and Liu Wenying. They meet six passengers on the boat – a poor girl named Xing Hua who had to work as a prostitute to pay her debts, a just woman teacher, an old actor of Beijing Opera, a frail elderly woman who has just lost her son, a young worker who has a clear stand on what to love and what to hate, and a little girl in rags.

One night, feeling hopeless about her life, Xin Hua attempts suicide by jumping into the river. Qiu Shi saves her and uses his own experience to encourage the poor girl. All the people aboard are deeply moved by this brave poet, including Li Yan and Liu Wenying. It turns out that the girl in rags is Qiu Shi's daughter. With the help of the passengers aboard, Qiu Shi with his daughter finally regain freedom.

Soundtrack
I'm a dandelion seed (我是一颗蒲公英种子)

Filming Locations
The Three Gorges

Accolades

References 

http://www.dvd.com.cn/movie/5523.html#comment

External links 

1980s Mandarin-language films
Chinese drama films
1980 films
Films directed by Wu Yigong
Films directed by Wu Yonggang